The 2018–19 Rugby Europe Women's Trophy was the 20th edition of Rugby Europe's second division competition for women's national rugby union teams.

Standings

Results

See also
 2018 Rugby Europe Women's Championship
 2019 Rugby Europe Women's Championship
 Rugby Europe Women's Championship
 Women's international rugby union § 2018
 Women's international rugby union § 2019

References

2019
2018 rugby union tournaments for national teams
2019 rugby union tournaments for national teams
Trophy
Rugby union in the Czech Republic
Rugby union in Finland
Rugby union in Switzerland